Marcus Street (born 6 February 1999) is an English professional rugby union player who plays as a tighthead prop for Premiership club Exeter Chiefs.

Rugby career

Club
Street is a product of the Exeter Chiefs academy and in November 2016 made his club debut against Cardiff in the Anglo-Welsh Cup. He came off the bench to replace Harry Williams in the 2020–21 Premiership Rugby final as Exeter finished runners up to Harlequins.

International
In April 2017 Street scored a try for the England under-18 team against Scotland and also participated in the 2017 Six Nations Under 20s Championship. He was selected for the 2017 World Rugby Under 20 Championship and scored tries in pool stage games against Samoa and Australia. Street also competed in the 2018 Six Nations Under 20s Championship and 2019 Six Nations Under 20s Championship.

References

1999 births
Living people
English rugby union players
Exeter Chiefs players
Rugby union players from Exeter
Rugby union props